The South Wales Echo is a daily tabloid newspaper published in Cardiff, Wales and distributed throughout the surrounding area. It has a circulation of 6,026.

Background

The newspaper was founded in 1884 and was based in Thomson House, Cardiff city centre. It is published by Media Wales Ltd (formerly Western Mail & Echo Ltd), part of the Reach plc group. In 2008, Media Wales moved from Thomson House, Havelock Street and Park Street, to Six Park Street and Scott Road, west  of the former main offices and printing plant, south of the Principality Stadium. There is a Weekend edition published every Saturday.

Among many other writers, novelist Ken Follett, science writer Brian J. Ford, cartoonist Gren Jones, journalist Sue Lawley
and news reader Michael Buerk, have spent part of their careers with the Echo.

Football Echo
An associated paper, the Football Echo, later called the Sport Echo, was published on Saturday afternoons from 1919 until 2006. Printed on-site, on pink paper, it was available soon after the final whistle of rugby and football matches, across the street. At its peak the Football Echo sold up to 80,000 copies.

See also
List of newspapers in Wales

References

External links
 - Media Wales Website of the South Wales Echo

1884 establishments in Wales
Publications established in 1884
Newspapers published in Wales
Companies based in Cardiff
Daily newspapers published in the United Kingdom
Newspapers published by Reach plc